Gary Fletcher may refer to:

 Gary Fletcher (musician), blues musician, best known for playing bass in The Blues Band
 Gary Taylor-Fletcher (born 1981), English professional footballer, formerly just called Gary Fletcher
 Gary Fletcher (fencer) (born 1962), British fencer